List of former automotive manufacturing plants. The table below lists former automotive industry manufacturing factories and facilities.

List of plants

See also
 List of automobile manufacturers
 Brownfield land
 Ford Piquette Avenue Plant
 Flint, Michigan auto industry
 List of GM factories
 List of Volkswagen Group factories

References

External links
 Production Halted at MG Rover Longbridge Plant. Steven Downes, (London) Times Online. Retrieved on 1 December 2005.
 It Takes Many Arrows to Kill an Elephant. Jerry Flint, Forbes, 29 November 2005. Retrieved on 1 December 2005. Many references to historic, closed facilities.
 Links to Early Automotive History, State of Michigan official website. Retrieved on 1 December 2005.
 Once teeming with auto plants, Detroit now home to only a few nameplates. Richard A. Wright, The Detroit News. Retrieved on 1 December 2005.
 General Motors--Brownfield Redevelopment
 Clasp Automotive

 01
.
Automotive manufacturing plants